Larvamima is a genus of mites placed in its own family, Larvamimidae, in the order Mesostigmata. Larvamima contains four recognized species:

 Larvamima marianae R. J. Elzinga, 1993
 Larvamima carli Elzinga, 1993
 Larvamima cristata Elzinga, 1993
 Larvamima schneirlai Elzinga, 1993

References

Mesostigmata